In systemic functional linguistics, the term tenor refers to the participants in a discourse, their relationships to each other, and their purposes.

In examining how context affects language use, linguists refer to the context-specific variety of language as a register. The three aspects of the context are known as field, tenor and mode. Field refers to the subject matter or content being discussed. Mode refers to the channel (such as writing, or video-conference) of the communication. By understanding these three variables, the kind of language likely to be used in a particular setting can be predicted — and, Michael Halliday suggests, this is exactly what we do, unconsciously, as language users.

 In analysing the parts of a metaphor, "tenor" has another meaning, unrelated to the meaning above. According to I. A. Richards, the two parts of a metaphor are the tenor and vehicle. The tenor is the subject to which attributes are ascribed. The vehicle is the subject from which the attributes are derived. Thus, they are broadly equivalent to the notions of target and source domains in conceptual metaphor theory.

See also
Affect (linguistics)

References

Systemic functional linguistics
Grammar
Discourse analysis